(correctly abbreviated nv, however, often abbreviated N.V. or NV) or (in the French Community of Belgium)  (SA) is a type of public company defined by business law in the Netherlands, Belgium, Indonesia (where it is known as , correctly abbreviated PT, however often abbreviated PT. or P.T. and allows for private companies), and Suriname. The company is owned by shareholders, and the company's shares are not registered to certain owners, so that they may be traded on the public stock market.

The phrase literally means "nameless partnership" or "anonymous venture" and comes from the fact that the partners (the shareholders) are not directly known. This is in contrast to the term for a private limited company, which is called  (an "exclusive" or "closed partnership", one in which stock is not for sale on open markets).

Each  is a legal entity in the Netherlands, Belgium, Aruba, Curaçao, Suriname, St. Maarten, and Indonesia. A minimum of €45,000 paid in capital is required to register a Dutch NV.

See also

AB (publ) (Publikt Aktiebolag) – the corresponding concept in Sweden and Finland
AG (Aktiengesellschaft) – the corresponding concept in Germany, Austria, and Switzerland
A/S (Aktieselskab) – the corresponding concept in Denmark
AS (Aksjeselskap) – the corresponding concept in Norway
BV (Besloten vennootschap) – a private (closed) limited company in the Netherlands and in Dutch-speaking Belgium. 
Inc (Incorporated) – the corresponding concept in US
Ltd (Limited) - The corresponding concept in Commonwealth countries such as India and other countries which is for public companies just Ltd or private companies with Pvt Ltd or Pte Ltd in Singapore.
Oyj (Julkinen Osakeyhtiö) – the corresponding concept in Finland
Plc (Public Limited Company) - the corresponding concept in the UK and Ireland
S.A. - the corresponding concept in Latin America, Portugal, France, Spain, and other Romanic countries, also in Poland and the Walloon region of Belgium
SE (Societas Europaea) – additional legal structure of a company available in the European Union
S.p.A. (Società per Azioni) - the corresponding concept in Italy
Types of companies

References 

Types of business entity